The Music Improvisation Company 1968–1971 is an album by saxophonist Evan Parker, guitarist Derek Bailey, electronic musician Hugh Davies and percussionist Jamie Muir which was recorded in 1968 and 1970 and released on the Incus label in 1976.

Reception

AllMusic's Thom Jurek stated "It is a necessary addition to anyone's library who is interested in improvised music".

The authors of the Penguin Guide to Jazz Recordings wrote: "the six pieces are in the main about a quartet thinking and speaking as freely with one another as they possibly could".

Track listing
All compositions by Derek Bailey, Hugh Davies, Jamie Muir and Evan Parker.

 "Pointing" – 7:19
 "Untitled 3" – 6:32
 "Untitled 4" – 4:09
 "Bedrest" – 7:37
 "Its Tongue Trapped to the Rock by a Limpet the Water Rat Succumbed to the Incoming Tide" – 9:01
 "In the Victim's Absence" – 10:33

Personnel
Derek Bailey – guitar
Hugh Davies – electronics, organ
Jamie Muir – percussion and cover art.
Evan Parker – soprano saxophone, amplified autoharp

References

Free improvisation albums
Incus Records albums
Derek Bailey (guitarist) albums
1976 albums
Evan Parker albums
Collaborative albums